"Angry Chair" is a song by the American rock band Alice in Chains. It was the third single from their album Dirt (1992). It is the eleventh song on most copies of the album and twelfth or tenth song on others. The song was included on the compilation albums Nothing Safe: Best of the Box (1999), Music Bank (1999), Greatest Hits (2001), and The Essential Alice in Chains (2006).

Origin and recording
The song was one of the few written entirely by vocalist Layne Staley for the band. In the liner notes of 1999's Music Bank box set collection, guitarist Jerry Cantrell said of the song:
Such a brilliant song. I'm very proud of Layne for writing it. When I've stepped up vocally in the past he's been so supportive, and here was a fine example of him stepping up with the guitar and writing a masterpiece.

Release and reception
"Angry Chair" was released as a single in 1992. "Angry Chair" peaked at number 34 on the Billboard Mainstream Rock Tracks chart and at number 27 on the Billboard Modern Rock Tracks chart. It is notable for being the only song by the band to chart higher on the Modern Rock Tracks chart than on the Mainstream Rock Tracks chart and most Alice in Chains singles usually either fail to enter the Modern Rock chart or chart lower. The UK single was released in May 1993. "Angry Chair" reached the top 40 in the UK and the top 30 in Ireland.

Ned Raggett of Allmusic said that "Layne Staley and Jerry Cantrell unsurprisingly are the ones who transform the song into something really spectacular" and added that the song features "entrancing verses, ominous, echo-swathed and charged with a looming destruction."

A MIDI version of "Angry Chair" appears on Map 25: Bloodfalls of the popular PC computer game Doom II.

Music video
The music video for "Angry Chair" was released in 1992 and was directed by Matt Mahurin, who later directed the "No Excuses" music video for the band. The video is available on the home video release Music Bank: The Videos.

Live performances
Dirt marked the introduction of Staley's guitar playing contributions to the group, and "Angry Chair" was one of the few songs he regularly played guitar on during live performances. The song is also a fan favorite. The ending to the song was often used as a lead in to another famous Alice in Chains song "Man in the Box" in concert. The current members of Alice in Chains performed an acoustic version of "Angry Chair" with ex-Stone Temple Pilots/ex-Velvet Revolver lead singer Scott Weiland in concert on September 30, 2007 in Austin, Texas.

Alice in Chains performed an acoustic version of "Angry Chair" for its appearance on MTV Unplugged in 1996 (although the song was omitted from the aired performance) and the song was included on the Unplugged live album and home video release. This version opens with an impromptu rendition by Cantrell of "Gloom, Despair and Agony on Me" from the TV show Hee Haw. Live performances of the song can also be found on the "Heaven Beside You" and "Get Born Again" singles and the live album Live.

Track listing
 "Angry Chair" – 4:47
 "Brother" – 4:27 (from Sap)

Limited Edition 4 Track Picture CD
 "Angry Chair" – 4:51 (from Dirt)
 "I Know Somethin' (bout You)" – 4:24 (from Facelift)
 "It Ain't Like That" (live) – 4:40
 "Hate to Feel" (live) – 5:35
Both live tracks recorded March 2, 1993

Personnel
Layne Staley – rhythm guitar, lead vocals
Jerry Cantrell – lead guitar, vocals
Mike Starr – bass
Sean Kinney – drums

Chart positions

References

1992 singles
Alice in Chains songs
Songs written by Layne Staley
1992 songs
Columbia Records singles